Lake Huascacocha (possibly from Quechua waskha or waska: rope; or wask'a: rectangle, long; and qucha: lake) or Lake Huacacocha is a lake in Peru located in Huánuco Region, Lauricocha Province, Jesús District. Lake Huascacocha lies in the north of the Raura mountain range, west of lakes Patarcocha and Chuspi.

See also 
 Yanajirca

References 

Lakes of Peru
Lakes of Huánuco Region